Alena Reichová-Zámostná (27 July 1933 – 21 June 2011) was a Czech gymnast who competed for Czechoslovakia in the 1952 Summer Olympics and in the 1956 Summer Olympics.

References

External links
 
 

1933 births
2011 deaths
Sportspeople from Plzeň
Czech female artistic gymnasts
Olympic gymnasts of Czechoslovakia
Gymnasts at the 1952 Summer Olympics
Gymnasts at the 1956 Summer Olympics
Olympic bronze medalists for Czechoslovakia
Olympic medalists in gymnastics
Medalists at the 1952 Summer Olympics